Cochylimorpha is a genus of moths of the family Tortricidae.

Species
Cochylimorpha acriapex (Razowski, 1967)
Cochylimorpha additana (Kennel, 1901)
Cochylimorpha africana Aarvik, 2010
Cochylimorpha agenjoi (Razowski, 1963)
Cochylimorpha alternana (Curtis, 1831)
Cochylimorpha alticolana (Razowski, 1964)
Cochylimorpha amabilis (Meyrick, in Caradja, 1931)
Cochylimorpha arenosana (Kuznetzov Jalava & Kullberg, 1998)
Cochylimorpha armeniana (de Joannis, 1891)
Cochylimorpha asiana (Kennel, 1899)
Cochylimorpha bipunctata (Bai Guo & Guo, 1996)
Cochylimorpha blandana (Eversmann, 1844)
Cochylimorpha brandti (Razowski, 1963)
Cochylimorpha centralasiae (Razowski, 1964)
Cochylimorpha chionella (Schawerda, 1924)
Cochylimorpha clathrana (Staudinger, 1871)
Cochylimorpha clathratana (Staudinger, 1880)
Cochylimorpha coloratana (Kennel, 1899)
Cochylimorpha conankinensis (Ge, 1992)
Cochylimorpha cultana (Lederer, 1855)
Cochylimorpha cuspidata (Ge, 1992)
Cochylimorpha declivana (Kennel, 1901)
Cochylimorpha decolorella (Zeller, 1839)
Cochylimorpha despectana (Kennel, 1899)
Cochylimorpha diana (Kennel, 1899)
Cochylimorpha discolorana (Kennel, 1899)
Cochylimorpha discopunctana (Eversmann, 1844)
Cochylimorpha eberti (Razowski, 1967)
Cochylimorpha eburneana (Kennel, 1899)
Cochylimorpha elegans (Razowski, 1963)
Cochylimorpha elongana (Fischer von Röslerstamm, 1839)
Cochylimorpha emiliana (Kennel, 1919)
Cochylimorpha erlebachi Huemer & Trematerra, 1997
Cochylimorpha exoterica (Meyrick, 1924)
Cochylimorpha flaveola (Falkovitsh, 1963)
Cochylimorpha fluens (Razowski, 1970)
Cochylimorpha fucatana (Snellen, 1883)
Cochylimorpha fucosa (Razowski, 1970)
Cochylimorpha fuscimacula (Falkovitsh, 1963)
Cochylimorpha gracilens (Ge, 1992)
Cochylimorpha halophilana (Christoph, 1872)
Cochylimorpha hapala (Diakonoff, 1984)
Cochylimorpha hedemanniana (Snellen, 1883)
Cochylimorpha hilarana (Herrich-Schäffer, 1851)
Cochylimorpha ignicolorana Junnilainen & Nupponen, in Nupponen, Junnilainen, Nupponen & Olschwag, 2001
Cochylimorpha innotatana (Warren, 1888)
Cochylimorpha isocornutana (Razowski, 1964)
Cochylimorpha jaculana (Snellen, 1883)
Cochylimorpha jucundana (Treitschke, 1835)
Cochylimorpha kenneli (Razowski, 1967)
Cochylimorpha kohibabae Razowski, 2005
Cochylimorpha kurdistana (Amsel, 1959)
Cochylimorpha lagara (Diakonoff, 1983)
Cochylimorpha langeana (Kalchberg, 1898)
Cochylimorpha lungtangensis (Razowski, 1964)
Cochylimorpha maleropa (Meyrick in Caradja & Meyrick, 1937)
Cochylimorpha meridiana (Staudinger, 1859)
Cochylimorpha meridiolana (Ragonot, 1894)
Cochylimorpha mongolicana (Ragonot, 1894)
Cochylimorpha monstrabilis (Razowski, 1970)
Cochylimorpha montana (Razowski, 1967)
Cochylimorpha moriutii (Kawabe, 1987)
Cochylimorpha nankinensis (Razowski, 1964)
Cochylimorpha nipponana (Razowski, 1977)
Cochylimorpha nodulana (Moschler, 1862)
Cochylimorpha nomadana (Erschoff, 1874)
Cochylimorpha nuristana (Razowski, 1967)
Cochylimorpha obliquana (Eversmann, 1844)
Cochylimorpha perfusana (Guenee, 1845)
Cochylimorpha perturbatana (Kennel, 1900)
Cochylimorpha peucedana (Ragonot, 1889)
Cochylimorpha pirizanica (Razowski, 1963)
Cochylimorpha psalmophanes (Meyrick, 1925)
Cochylimorpha pseudoalternana (Chambon & Khous, 1993)
Cochylimorpha pyramidana (Staudinger, 1871)
Cochylimorpha razowskiana Kuznetzov, 2005
Cochylimorpha salinarida Groenen & Larsen, 2003
Cochylimorpha santolinana (Staudinger, 1871)
Cochylimorpha scoptes (Razowski, 1984)
Cochylimorpha scrophulana (Razowski, 1963)
Cochylimorpha simplicis (Bai Guo & Guo, 1996)
Cochylimorpha simulata (Razowski, 1970)
Cochylimorpha sparsana (Staudinger, 1880)
Cochylimorpha stataria (Razowski, 1970)
Cochylimorpha straminea (Haworth, [1811])
Cochylimorpha subwoliniana (Danilevsky, in Danilevsky, Kuznetsov & Falkovitsh, 1962)
Cochylimorpha tamerlana (Ragonot, 1894)
Cochylimorpha thomasi Karisch, 2003
Cochylimorpha tiraculana (Bassi & Scaramozzino, 1989)
Cochylimorpha triangulifera (Kuznetzov, 1966)
Cochylimorpha wiltshirei (Razowski, 1963)
Cochylimorpha woliniana (Schleich, 1868)
Cochylimorpha yangtseana Razowski, 2006

Synonyms 
 Atroposta Pogue, 1990, in Pogue & Mickevich, Cladistics 6: 322. [nomen nudum]
 Bipenisia Razowski, 1960, Polskie Pismo Ent. 30: 30:. Type species: Cochylis jucundana Treitschke, 1835. [subgenus of Stenodes]
 Bleszynskiella Razowski, 1960, Polskie Pismo Ent. 30: 30:. Type species: Orthotaenia alternana Curtis, 1831. [subgenus of Euxanthoides]
 Cagiva Pogue, 1990, in Pogue & Mickevich, Cladistics 6: 322. [nomen nudum]
 Cybilla Pogue, 1990, in Pogue & Mickevich, Cladistics 6: 322. [nomen nudum]
 Eustenodes Razowski, 1960, Polskie Pismo Ent. 30: 30:. Type species: Euxanthis dorsimaculana Preissecker, 1908. [subgenus of Stenodes]
 Euxanthoides Razowski, 1960, Polskie Pismo Ent. 30: 30:. Type species: Tortrix straminea Haworth, [1811].
 Honca Pogue, 1990, in Pogue & Mickevich, Cladistics 6: 322. [nomen nudum]
 Nycthia Pogue, 1990, in Pogue & Mickevich, Cladistics 6: 322. [nomen nudum]
 Parastenodes Razowski, 1960, Polskie Pismo Ent. 30: 30:. Type species: Cochylis meridiana Staudinger, 1859. [subgenus of Stenodes]
 Paraxanthoides Razowski, 1960, Polskie Pismo Ent. 30: 30:. Type species: Tortrix (Cochylis) chamomillana Herrich-Schäffer, 1851. [subgenus of Euxanthoides]
 Poterioparvus Pogue, 1990, in Pogue & Mickevich, Cladistics 6: 322. [nomen nudum]
 Stenodes Guenée, 1845, Annls Soc. ent. Fr 2(3): 298. Type species: Cochylis elongana Fischer von Röslerstamm, 1839. [preoccupied]
 Substenodes Razowski, 1960, Polskie Pismo Ent. 30: 30:. Type species: Cochylis pontana Staudinger, 1859. [subgenus of Stenodes]

See also
List of Tortricidae genera

References

 , 2010: Review of East African Cochylini (Lepidoptera, Tortricidae) with description of new species. Norwegian Journal of Entomology 57 (2): 81-108. Abstract: .
 , 2005: World Catalogue of Insects vol. 5 Tortricidae.
 , 1998: The leaf-rollers (Lepidoptera: Tortricidae) of western Tuva, with description of Cochylimorpha arenosana sp. n. Entomologica Fennica 19 (4): 197-209.
 , 1959, Polskie Pismo Ent. 29: 29
 , 2006: Notes on Cochylimorpha Razowski, 1959 with description of one new species from Tibet (Tortricidae). Nota Lepidopterologica 29 (1-2): 121-124. Full article: .
 ;  2013: Cochylimorpha Razowski (Lepidoptera: Tortricidae: Cochylini) in China: one new species, three newly recorded species and description of the female of three species. Entomologica fennica, 24(4): 193-203. Full article (PDF)

External links
Tortricidae.com

 
Tortricidae genera
Cochylini
Taxa named by Józef Razowski